Hezron is a name which occurs several times in the Hebrew Bible.

It may refer to:
 A plain in the south of Judah, south of Kadesh-barnea. (Book of Joshua)
 A son of Reuben (son of Jacob).  (Book of Genesis 46:9)
 A grandson of Judah (son of Jacob) and the grandfather of Amminadab and great-grandfather to Nahshon.  Nahshon was Elisheba's brother and brother-in-law of Aaron.  (Book of Exodus 6:23, Matthew 1:3)

He was also the man appointed by Moses, as ordered by God, to be Prince over the tribe of Judah.  He was the son of Perez, the son of Judah (son of Jacob) (Gen 46:12).  His family are further detailed in 1 Chronicles 2, which records he had five sons by more than one woman.  By an unnamed mother, he had Jerahmeel, Ram, and Caleb (2:9). By Abijah, daughter of Makir, whom he married when aged 60 years, he had Segub (2:21) and Ashhur. Ashhur was born posthumously following Hezron's death. (2:24)
 A tribal leader when Moses led the Israelites out of Egypt. He died in the wilderness.

References

Tribe of Judah
Book of Exodus people
Gospel of Matthew
Book of Joshua
Book of Genesis people
Books of Chronicles people

he:חצרון